Attila Levin (born November 8, 1976) is a Swedish professional boxer.

Amateur career
Levin had a decent amateur career prior to turning professional.

In 1996 Levin competed at the European Championships in Vejle, Denmark as a Super Heavyweight. Results were:
Defeated Henryk Zatyka (Poland) points
Defeated Petr Horáček (Czech Republic) TKO 1
Lost to Wladimir Klitschko (Ukraine) points
Levin represented Sweden as a Super Heavyweight at the 1996 Olympic Games in Atlanta, Georgia. Results were:
Defeated Jean-François Bergeron (Canada) TKO 1
Lost to Wladimir Klitschko (Ukraine) TKO by 1

Professional career
Levin turned pro in 1997 and started off his pro career going undefeated in his first 14 fights. He then faced journeyman Ramon Hayes in 2000, and was upset via TKO after being dropped twice. Levin then ran off another winning streak knocking out guys like Ray Austin before facing fringe contender Jeremy Williams in 2004, and losing via TKO in the 8th. He then fought undefeated Nikolay Valuev, and was TKO'd in the 3rd round. After three years off he restarted his career in 2008 with a win against Willie Perryman (TKO) in a boxing gala held in Kissimmee, Florida. On 28 November 2010 he lost to Robert Helenius via TKO in the 2nd round.

Professional boxing record

|-
|align="center" colspan=8|35 Wins (27 knockouts, 8 decisions), 4 Losses (4 knockouts) 
|-
| align="center" style="border-style: none none solid solid; background: #e3e3e3"|Result
| align="center" style="border-style: none none solid solid; background: #e3e3e3"|Record
| align="center" style="border-style: none none solid solid; background: #e3e3e3"|Opponent
| align="center" style="border-style: none none solid solid; background: #e3e3e3"|Type
| align="center" style="border-style: none none solid solid; background: #e3e3e3"|Round
| align="center" style="border-style: none none solid solid; background: #e3e3e3"|Date
| align="center" style="border-style: none none solid solid; background: #e3e3e3"|Location
| align="center" style="border-style: none none solid solid; background: #e3e3e3"|Notes
|-align=center
|Win
|align=left|
|align=left| Marios Kollias
|UD
|4
|11/04/2019
|align=left| Clarion Hotel Post, Gothenburg
|align=left|
|-align=center
|Loss
|align=left|
|align=left| Robert Helenius
|TKO
|2 (12), 
|27/11/2010
|align=left| Hartwall Areena, Helsinki
|align=left|
|-
|Win
|
|align=left| Edgars Kalnars
|TKO
|1 (8), 
|27/11/2009
|align=left| Pyynikin Palloiluhalli, Tampere
|align=left|
|-
|Win
|
|align=left| Leri Okhanashvili
|TKO
|3 (6), 
|24/10/2009
|align=left| Urheilutalo, Helsinki
|align=left|
|-
|Win
|
|align=left| Adnan Buharalija
|TKO
|4 (6)
|04/09/2009
|align=left| Lofbergs Lila Arena, Karlstad
|align=left|
|-
|Win
|
|align=left| Evgeny Orlov
|UD
|4
|05/09/2008
|align=left| Nojesfabriken, Karlstad
|align=left|
|-
|Win
|
|align=left| Willie Perryman
|KO
|1 (6), 
|28/03/2008
|align=left| Kissimmee Civic Center, Kissimmee, Florida
|align=left|
|-
|Loss
|
|align=left| Nikolay Valuev
|TKO
|3 (12), 
|12/02/2005
|align=left| Max-Schmeling-Halle, Prenzlauer Berg, Berlin
|align=left|
|-
|Loss
|
|align=left| Jeremy Williams
|TKO
|8 (10), 
|15/04/2004
|align=left| Hammerstein Ballroom, New York City
|align=left|
|-
|Win
|
|align=left| Pedro Daniel Franco
|KO
|3 (8)
|13/12/2003
|align=left| Nuremberg Arena, Nuremberg, Bavaria
|align=left|
|-
|Win
|
|align=left| Kenny Craven
|KO
|2 (8)
|04/10/2003
|align=left| Stadthalle, Zwickau, Saxony
|align=left|
|-
|Win
|
|align=left| Fernely Feliz
|UD
|10
|24/05/2003
|align=left| Reno Hilton Casino Resort, Reno, Nevada
|align=left|
|-
|Win
|
|align=left| Gary Winmon
|KO
|1 (8), 
|18/04/2003
|align=left| A La Carte Event Pavilion, Tampa, Florida
|align=left|
|-
|Win
|
|align=left| Ross Puritty
|UD
|10
|08/09/2002
|align=left| Great Plains Coliseum, Lawton, Oklahoma
|align=left|
|-
|Win
|
|align=left| Ron Guerrero
|UD
|10
|29/03/2002
|align=left| Paris Las Vegas, Las Vegas, Nevada
|align=left|
|-
|Win
|
|align=left| Jim Huffman
|TKO
|2 (5)
|30/01/2002
|align=left| Level Nightclub, Miami Beach, Florida
|align=left|
|-
|Win
|
|align=left| Fred Westgeest
|TKO
|5 (8)
|01/12/2001
|align=left| Jacob K. Javits Convention Center, New York City
|align=left|
|-
|Win
|
|align=left| Troy Weida
|TKO
|3 (6), 
|13/10/2001
|align=left| Parken Stadium, Copenhagen
|align=left|
|-
|Win
|
|align=left| Ray Austin
|TKO
|9 (10), 
|20/07/2001
|align=left| Caesars Palace, Las Vegas, Nevada
|align=left|
|-
|Win
|
|align=left| Miguel Otero Ocasio
|TKO
|2 (6)
|30/04/2001
|align=left| Ronne Idraetshal, Ronne
|align=left|
|-
|Win
|
|align=left| A.J. Moore
|RTD
|3 (6), 
|22/02/2001
|align=left| Harrisburg, Pennsylvania
|align=left|
|-
|Win
|
|align=left| Russell Chasteen
|TKO
|2 (6), 
|08/12/2000
|align=left| Hard Rock Hotel and Casino, Las Vegas, Nevada
|align=left|
|-
|Win
|
|align=left| Chavez Francisco
|TKO
|2 (6)
|02/11/2000
|align=left| Bethlehem, Pennsylvania
|align=left|
|-
|Win
|
|align=left| Marcellus Brown
|TKO
|3 (6), 
|06/10/2000
|align=left| Hard Rock Hotel and Casino, Las Vegas, Nevada
|align=left|
|-
|Loss
|
|align=left| Ramon Hayes
|TKO
|1 (6), 
|29/06/2000
|align=left| Hammerstein Ballroom, New York City
|align=left|
|-
|Win
|
|align=left| Bryant Smith
|UD
|6
|24/02/2000
|align=left| Hammerstein Ballroom, New York City
|align=left|
|-
|Win
|
|align=left| Marcus Johnson
|UD
|6
|29/10/1999
|align=left| Molson Centre, Montreal, Quebec
|align=left|
|-
|Win
|
|align=left| Eddie Richardson
|UD
|8
|16/09/1999
|align=left| Grand Casino, Biloxi, Mississippi
|align=left|
|-
|Win
|
|align=left| Steve Barnes Edwards
|TKO
|2 (6), 
|05/08/1999
|align=left| Grand Casino, Tunica, Mississippi
|align=left|
|-
|Win
|
|align=left| Booker T Word
|KO
|2 (6), 
|20/05/1999
|align=left| Grand Casino, Tunica, Mississippi
|align=left|
|-
|Win
|
|align=left| Curtis Branch
|TKO
|3 (4)
|15/04/1999
|align=left| Miccosukee Casino, Miami, Florida
|align=left|
|-
|Win
|
|align=left| Kimmuel Odum
|TKO
|2 (10)
|12/03/1999
|align=left| Roseland Ballroom, New York City
|align=left|
|-
|Win
|
|align=left| Cornelius Ellis
|TKO
|1 (4)
|12/12/1998
|align=left| The Ritz, Raleigh, North Carolina
|align=left|
|-
|Win
|
|align=left| Louis Gallucci
|TKO
|3 (4), 
|16/10/1998
|align=left| Memorial Auditorium, Fort Lauderdale, Florida
|align=left|
|-
|Win
|
|align=left| Ron McGowan
|KO
|1 (4), 
|02/10/1998
|align=left| Lake Charles, Louisiana
|align=left|
|-
|Win
|
|align=left| Raymond Ladner
|TKO
|1 (4), 
|20/08/1998
|align=left| Sheraton Hotel, Houston, Texas
|align=left|
|-
|Win
|
|align=left| Derrick Edwards
|TKO
|1 (4), 
|02/06/1998
|align=left| Charlotte County Auditorium, Punta Gorda, Florida
|align=left|
|-
|Win
|
|align=left| Mitchell Johnson
|TKO
|1 (4), 
|04/04/1998
|align=left| Miccosukee Casino, Miami, Florida
|align=left|
|-
|Win
|
|align=left| Isaac Poole
|TKO
|1 (4)
|25/07/1997
|align=left| Davidson Theatre, Pembroke Pines, Florida
|align=left|
|}

External links

 
 sports-reference

1976 births
Living people
Heavyweight boxers
Olympic boxers of Sweden
Boxers at the 1996 Summer Olympics
Sportspeople from Stockholm
Swedish male boxers